is a JR West railway station in the city of Ōno, Fukui, Japan.

Lines

Station layout
The station consists of one dead-headed side platform serving single bi-directional track. The log cabin style station building is staffed.

Adjacent stations

History
Kuzuryūko Station opened on December 15, 1972.  With the privatization of Japanese National Railways (JNR) on 1 April 1987, the station came under the control of JR West. The station was closed from July 2004 to July 2007 due to damage from torrential rains.

Surrounding area
 Kuzuryu Dam
former Izumi Village Hall

See also
 List of railway stations in Japan

External links

  

Railway stations in Fukui Prefecture
Stations of West Japan Railway Company
Railway stations in Japan opened in 1972
Etsumi-Hoku Line
Ōno, Fukui